The Dickinson Electronic Archives (DEA) is a website devoted to the study of Emily Dickinson, her writing practices, writings directly influencing her work, and critical and creative writings generated by her work. The DEA is produced by the Dickinson Editing Collective, with an executive editor, a general editor, two associate editors, a project manager, and a technical editor working collaboratively with one another and with numerous coeditors, staff, and users.

History 

The Dickinson Electronic Archives was begun in 1994 by Emily Dickinson scholar and University of Maryland, College Park professor Martha Nell Smith.  It was the first online digital repository of its kind and featured a limited number of Dickinson manuscripts and correspondences.

In 2000, the DEA received its first major overhaul.  This overhaul included the additions of more manuscripts and correspondences, as well as Titanic Operas – a section highlighting the responses of contemporary poets to Emily Dickinson – and a section of the DEA dedicated to helping teachers utilize digital resources in classroom instruction.

Current 
Although originally created to showcase the writings of and scholarship concerning American poet Emily Dickinson, the Dickinson Electronic Archives projects have since expanded to include as well the writings of Emily Dickinson's correspondents, many of whom were family members such as Susan Dickinson and nephew Edward (Ned) Dickinson.  The DEA has also grown to feature numerous images of Dickinson’s manuscripts – both poetic manuscripts and letters – as well as detailed scholastic analysis by executive editor Martha Nell Smith and other leading Dickinson scholars.

One of the primary missions of the Dickinson Electronic Archives is to enhance knowledge surrounding Emily Dickinson, one of the United States' most admired and popular poets and beloved nineteenth-century figures, through the contextual clues of her creative process as discovered in her manuscripts.  While casual biographies of Dickinson are likely to describe the poet as isolated, morbid, crazy, humorless, and a writer of "little poems," her written records suggest otherwise.  Dickinson’s manuscripts and correspondences, as showcased in the Dickinson Electronic Archives, show that Emily Dickinson sometimes collaborated with another writer, that she sometimes reveled in a bawdy sense of humor, and that letter writing became an artistic form for her, one she exploited for poetic experimentation.

Citations and References 
As a leader in Digital humanities and one of the first digital literature projects, the Dickinson Electronic Archives have been at the center of critical discussion for over ten years, appearing at the center of critical discussion in hundreds of scholarly articles, journals, and books.

Emily Dickinson
Internet properties established in 1994
1994 establishments in Maryland